David Corbin may refer to:
 David R. Corbin (born 1944), Kansas state legislator
 David T. Corbin (1833–1905), American lawyer and politician